In local usage, a burn is a kind of watercourse. The term applies to a large stream or a small river. The word is used in Scotland and England (especially North East England) and in parts of Ulster, Australia and New Zealand.

Etymology
The cognate of burn in standard English is "bourn", "bourne", "borne", "born", which is retained in placenames like Bournemouth, King's Somborne, Holborn, Melbourne. A cognate in German is Born (contemp. Brunnen), meaning "well", "spring" or "source", which is retained in placenames like Paderborn in Germany. Both the English and German words derive from the same Proto-Germanic root.

Scots Gaelic has the word bùrn, also cognate, but which means "fresh water"; the actual Gaelic for a "burn" is allt (sometimes anglicised as "ault" or "auld" in placenames.)

Examples

Blackburn
Broxburn
Bucks Burn
Burnside
Braid Burn
Dighty Burn
Burn Dale, East Donegal
Burnfoot, Inishowen
Burn of Elsick
Burn of Pheppie
Burn of Muchalls
Bannockburn
Crawfordsburn
Cronaniv Burn, Gaoth Dobhair
Gisburn
Hebburn
Jordan Burn
Kilburn (disambiguation)
Lyburn
Ouseburn
Routeburn Track
Seaburn
Seaton Burn
Shirburn
Tedburn
Tyburn
Westburn
Whitburn
Whitlawburn
Winkburn
Winterburn
Wooburn

References

External links

 Scottish Words and Place-Names:Place-Name Glossary

Water streams
Landforms
Northumbrian folklore
Rural Scotland
Scots language
Scottish English
Scottish toponyms
Rivers of Scotland
Rivers of Northumberland
 
Rivers of Ireland